Benedict Barnham (baptised 1559 – 1598) was a London merchant, alderman and sheriff of London and MP.

Life
Barnham was born the fourth son of the merchant Francis Barnham (died 1575), a draper, alderman and sheriff of London in 1570, and Alice (1523–1604) daughter of William Bradbridge (d. 1546). He was baptised in 1559. Barnham along with his elder brother Martin (baptised 1548, died 1610) was educated at St. Alban's Hall, Oxford, but left apparently without a degree.

Barnham became a liveryman of the Drapers' Company. He was elected Member of Parliament for Minehead in 1589. On 14 October 1591 he was chosen alderman of Bread Street ward (a position he held for the rest of his life). In the same year he was third warden of the Drapers' Company, but surrendered this post on election as sheriff for the year 1591 and 1592 (At 32 he was considered young to be sheriff but thirteen men more senior than he had declined to serve owing to the financial demands of the office). He served two terms as Master of the Drapers' Company in 1592–1593 and 1596–1597. In 1597 he sat in Parliament for the second time, this time representing Yarmouth, Isle of Wight.

Barnham was a member of the Elizabethan College of Antiquaries. He died 3 April 1598, aged 39, and an elaborate monument was erected above his grave in St Clement Eastcheap.

Barnham was acquiring estates by 1575 and by his death he held property in London, and land in Essex, Hampshire and Kent valued at £20,100. The chief beneficiaries were his wife and daughters, but Wood tells that he left £200 to St. Alban's Hall, Oxford, to rebuild "its front next the street", and that "as a testimony of the benefaction his arms were engraved over the gateway and on the plate belonging to the house".

Family
Barnham married Dorothy (died 1639), daughter of Ambrose Smith of Cheapside (the silkman to Queen Elizabeth), at St Clement Eastcheap on 28 April 1583. They had eight children. Three girls and a boy died in infancy. The remaining four girls lived to marry: Elizabeth the eldest married Mervyn Tuchet, 2nd Earl of Castlehaven, Alice married Sir Francis Bacon in 1606, and Bridget married Sir William Soame of Thurlow, Suffolk.

Dorothy survived her husband, and became, a year or two after his death, the wife of Sir John Pakington.

Notes

References

Wills Proved in the Prerogative Court of Canterbury 1584–1604 1584 to 1604. County: General Country: England 1598 Barnham, Benedict, citizen and alderman of London. Lands in Middlesex, Hampshire, Essex 39, 40 Lewyn.

Further reading

1550s births
1598 deaths
Councilmen and Aldermen of the City of London
English merchants
16th-century merchants
Sheriffs of the City of London
English people of the Anglo-Spanish War (1585–1604)
English MPs 1589
English MPs 1597–1598
16th-century English businesspeople